County Route 546 (CR 546) is a county highway in the U.S. state of New Jersey. The highway begins at Route 29 within the Titusville, New Jersey section of Hopewell Township and extends  to U.S. Route 1 (US 1) in Lawrence Township. The road runs entirely within Mercer County.

Route description

CR 546 begins at an intersection with Route 29 in Hopewell Township, heading northeast on two-lane undivided Washington Crossing-Pennington Road. Past Route 29, the road crosses over the Delaware River on the Washington Crossing Bridge and connects to PA 532 in Washington Crossing, Pennsylvania. CR 546 runs northeast from the western terminus into wooded areas of Washington Crossing State Park. After a turn to the east, the route crosses CR 579 and passes a mix of homes and farms. The road has intersections with CR 637 (Jacobs Creek Road) and CR 611 (Scotch Road) before crossing over CSX’s Trenton Subdivision. Immediately after the bridge, CR 546 has a junction with CR 631 (Ingleside Avenue) prior to reaching the Pennington Circle, a traffic circle, where it meets Route 31 and CR 640 (South Main Street).

A short distance after the circle, the route intersects CR 632 (Blackwell Road) and turns onto Pennington-Lawrenceville Road at that point. The road enters Lawrence Township as it heads into areas of increasing suburban residential neighborhoods and makes a turn to the southeast. In this area, the route crosses US 206 and becomes Franklin Corner Road. A short distance later, the road has a junction with Interstate 295 (I-295) that has a ramp from southbound I-295 to eastbound CR 546. After I-295, CR 546 crosses CR 583 (Princeton Pike) before reaching its eastern terminus at US 1. Past US 1, the road continues east as Bakers Basin Road.

Major intersections

See also

References

External links

New Jersey 5xx Routes (Dan Moraseski)

Roads in Mercer County, New Jersey
500-series county routes in New Jersey